Jasmine Lucilla Elizabeth Jennifer van den Bogaerde (born 15 May 1996), better known by her stage name Birdy, is an English singer and songwriter. She won the music competition Open Mic UK in 2008, at the age of 12.

Her debut single, a cover version of Bon Iver's "Skinny Love", was her breakthrough, charting all across Europe and earning platinum certification six times in Australia. Her self-titled debut album, Birdy, was released on 7 November 2011 to similar success, peaking at number one in Australia, Belgium and the Netherlands. Her second studio album, Fire Within, was released on 23 September 2013 in the UK. At the 2014 Brit Awards, she was nominated for Best British Female Solo Artist. Her third studio album, Beautiful Lies, was released on 25 March 2016. Her fourth studio album Young Heart was released on 30 April 2021.

Early life
Birdy was born on 15 May 1996, in Lymington, England, United Kingdom. Her father is Rupert Oliver Benjamin van den Bogaerde, a writer; her mother is Sophie Patricia (née Roper-Curzon), a concert pianist. Birdy learned to play the piano at the age of seven, and began writing her own music at the age of eight. She stated that listening to classical music and the songs her mother played has been a big influence on her sound. Her parents were married in 1995 and have two other children: Jake, born in 1997, and Caitlin in 1999. She also has two elder half-brothers, Moses and Sam, from her father's first marriage.

Birdy studied at Durlston Court Prep School in Barton on Sea, at Priestlands School, and at Brockenhurst College, a sixth form college in the New Forest. Her maternal grandfather was Captain John Christopher Ingram Roper-Curzon, the 20th Baron Teynham, and she grew up on the family estate near Lymington, Hampshire. Her great-uncle was the actor Sir Dirk Bogarde. She has English, Belgian (Flemish), Dutch and Scottish ancestry.

Birdy's second given name, Lucilla, was the name of her father's stepmother.

Birdy's stage name comes from the nickname her parents gave her as a baby, because she opened her mouth like a little bird when being fed.

Career

2008–2012: Early career

In 2008, while still a 12-year-old pupil at Durlston Court Preparatory School, Birdy won the UK talent contest Open Mic UK, a spinoff of the Live and Unsigned competition. She won both the under-18s category and the Grand Prize, against 10,000 other competitors. She performed her own song, called "So Be Free", at the competition in front of 2,000 people.

In 2009, Birdy performed live on piano for BBC Radio 3's Pianothon in London. In January 2011, at the age of 14, Birdy released a cover version of Bon Iver's song "Skinny Love". The song became her first hit on the UK Singles Chart, peaking at 17. The single was chosen as "Record of the Week" by UK radio DJ Fearne Cotton, resulting in it being added to BBC Radio 1's B‑list playlist as soon as it was released in March 2011. The official music video for the song was directed by Sophie Muller. The song was also featured on The Vampire Diaries episode "The Sun Also Rises", which aired on 5 May 2011. "Skinny Love" peaked at number 1 in the Netherlands.

Since then, Birdy has covered a number of songs, including "The A Team" by Ed Sheeran and the xx's "Shelter". On 19 July 2011, she performed in BBC Radio 1's Live Lounge. In the session, she performed both "Shelter" and "The A Team". Her cover of "Shelter" was also featured on The Vampire Diaries episode "The End of the Affair", which aired on 29 September 2011.

Birdy's eponymous debut album of cover versions (plus one original song written by her) was released on 7 November 2011; the album peaked at No. 13 in the UK, No. 40 in Ireland and number 1 in Belgium, the Netherlands and Australia. In August 2012 her début album peaked at number one in Australia, while the singles "Skinny Love" and "People Help the People" peaked at numbers 2 and 10 respectively.

In June 2012, Birdy contributed the song "Learn Me Right" with Mumford & Sons to the Pixar film Brave for which she received her first Grammy Award nomination.

On 7 August 2012, Birdy released her "Live in London" EP, which contained  eight songs. This included her cover of Ed Sheeran's "The A Team" and her song from The Hunger Games soundtrack, "Just a Game". On 29 August 2012 Birdy performed ANOHNI's song "Bird Gerhl" (from Antony and the Johnsons' I Am a Bird Now album) during the opening ceremony of the London Paralympic Games. In October 2012, Birdy sang live on French TV music programme Taratata, performing "Call Me Maybe" by Carly Rae Jepsen.

Birdy paid a visit to Australia in August 2012, during which Dolly magazine took her on a visit to Taronga Zoo in Sydney. She also made appearances on shows such as Sunrise and The X Factor singing "Skinny Love" and "People Help the People".

2013–2015: Fire Within and touring

On 16 February 2013, Birdy sang at Sanremo Music Festival 2013. She then announced the release of her second studio album, entitled Fire Within, via a YouTube video on 10 July 2013. The video included footage of Birdy in the studio along with a preview of two songs, "Wings" and "No Angel", which are both featured on the album. The first official single, "Wings", was released on 22 July 2013 and a second song, "All You Never Say", was sent to subscribers of Birdy's mailing list and posted on YouTube on 15 August 2013. The song "Wings" was also featured on The Vampire Diaries episode "Home", which aired on 15 May 2014 (her eighteenth birthday). The album was released in the UK and other surrounding countries on 23 September 2013 and received mostly positive reviews. In North America, the album was released on 3 June 2014. A subsequent EP entitled Breathe was released on 24 September.

Birdy did tours of America and Australia in 2013. After her concert in the Palais Theatre in Melbourne, Australia, a reviewer described her as a sensational pianist who appears to be shy and timid, but whose voice "rings throughout the theatre." The only criticism was that what was "severely lacking" was any sense of crowd interaction. The tour also included appearances on TV shows like Sunrise, on which she sang "Wings." While in Melbourne, Birdy also sang "Skinny Love" at the Logie Awards in April 2013.

In September 2013, Birdy covered a song entitled "Let Her Go" by Passenger, live on BBC Radio 1 Live Lounge. This track features on the BBC Radio 1 Live Lounge 2013 album. In December 2013, Birdy performed "Mandela Day" with James Blunt, originally by Simple Minds, at the NRJ Music Awards. Also in December 2013, she performed "L'Idole Des Jeunes" with Johnny Hallyday on Le Grand Show.

Birdy won the Best International Rock/Pop Artist award at the Echo Award 2014, held at Messe Berlin on 17 March 2014, beating out Agnetha Faltskog, Lorde, Katy Perry and Christina Sturmer. She performed "Words As Weapons" during the presentation.

In October 2014, Birdy covered "Lucky Star" by Madonna, appearing on the BBC Radio 2's Sounds of the 80s album. In the same year, Birdy was featured on four of the tracks on the Shadows album by Native Roses, in which her elder brother, Moses, is a drummer.

Birdy contributed three songs to the soundtrack for the movie The Fault in Our Stars: "Tee Shirt", "Best Shot" (with Jaymes Young) and "Not About Angels". Videos for both were released. Birdy appears on the 2014 David Guetta album Listen, featured on the song "I'll Keep Loving You".

Birdy's song "Wings," from her second album, was used as the soundtrack to the Lloyds Bank 250-year anniversary Horse Story advertisements in June 2015.

In August 2015, Birdy co-wrote "Let It All Go" with Rhodes. The single was released on 11 September 2015 via digital download in the UK. In October 2015, Birdy performed a cover of Firestone, originally by Kygo ft. Conrad Sewell on BBC Radio 1's Live Lounge. This track featured on the BBC Radio 1's Live Lounge 2015 album.

2016–2021: Beautiful Lies and Young Heart

In January 2016, Birdy released "Keeping Your Head Up", the first single from her third album, Beautiful Lies, which she had started writing material for in 2014 while touring in America. "Beautiful Lies", the second single from the album was released in February. "Wild Horses", the third single from the album was released in March. The album itself was released on 25 March 2016. On 20 April 2016, the Japanese Edition of Beautiful Lies was released, containing a bonus track entitled "Lights".

Speaking about Beautiful Lies, Birdy later said this album was what she was most proud of. She added:
"The album is about growing up and not accepting change. It's about not really wanting to grow up; it's about lying to yourself. I'd missed a lot of growing up with my family so it's about that. It's also inspired by 'Memories of a Geisha' so it has an Asian feel to it and it's about feeling a much stronger person."

On 1 April 2016, Birdy performed a cover of 'Adventure of a Lifetime' originally by Coldplay for 3FM. On 16 April 2016, Birdy released a limited edition vinyl for Record Store Day of the songs 'Lost It All' and 'Take You Everywhere I Go'. On 25 April 2016, Birdy performed a cover of "Fast Car" by Tracy Chapman for BBC Radio 1 Live Lounge, and on 27 April she performed a cover of "Sorry" by Justin Bieber at SiriusXM Studios.

On 8 May 2016, Birdy performed 'Wild Horses' at the opening ceremony of the British Academy of Film and Television Arts (BAFTA) awards night, at the Royal Festival Hall in London. She was also the face of the REDValentino spring/summer campaign for 2016 and 2017.

In June 2016, Birdy released three digital albums without publicity. The albums consisted entirely of instrumental works featuring her on the piano, and were called "Ornithology," "Vogelfrei" and "Nightbird." In April 2018, she uploaded these albums to her YouTube channel in a collaboration with Believe SAS, a French company that distributes digital music for independent labels and artists.

On 23 September 2016, "Beautiful Birds" was released by Passenger, featuring Birdy. On 4 November 2016, "Find Me" was released by Sigma, featuring Birdy. The song peaked at number 36 on the UK Singles Chart and number one on the Billboard Dance Club Songs chart in its 20 May 2017 issue.

Birdy undertook extensive touring after the release of Beautiful Lies, including a tour of the United States and an Asian tour from Japan to Singapore. By this time, her band had grown from four to five, with an almost completely new lineup. The band members were: Charlotte Hatherley (guitar), Joel Grainger (violin), Richard Evans (bass), Jay Sikora (drums) and Hazel Mills (keyboards). She has said she found Asia like another planet, "such a different world." The audiences were very reserved and quiet, there would be a huge gap after each song, then they would start clapping; it made her wonder if they liked her. She said they don't really clap that much, then after the show they were going crazy and screaming. She found it "really strange."

In an interview with Interview magazine, on 22 March 2016, Birdy explained how she had always had ideas but was never confident enough to assert them. With 'Beautiful Lies', she felt that she was a lot stronger and everything felt better. Birdy stated that where she had gone wrong with her second album had been that she had compromised too much, allowing others to influence her too much. In contrast, with 'Beautiful Lies' she had been 'really bossy'. In conclusion, she added that she loves writing for film and would love to do more of it; it was a 'really natural' progression for her work.

Birdy was featured on the cover of Wonderland magazine in the Autumn 2016 issue, with an accompanying shoot and interview. Speaking to the magazine, Birdy explained that her mother was a concert pianist and a lot of her family were very musical. Her mother would play classical music and her father would play "poppier records" like Tracy Chapman and The Beatles. It was a real mix of genres, she told the magazine.

Birdy performed two songs at the BFI Luminous fundraising gala on 3 October 2017. Interviewed at the function, she said she was writing material for her new album, but it was still in the early stages.

In December 2017, Variety.com reported that Warner/Chappell Music, the publishing arm of Warner Music Group, had signed Birdy to a global publishing deal. Mike Smith, Warner/Chappell UK managing director, said that Birdy was an incredible talent, there was a lot more to come from her and he looked forward to working with her in the years ahead.

After taking a break from music, Birdy released a new single, "Open Your Heart" on 4 September 2020. This was soon after accompanied with the announcement of a new EP, Piano Sketches, to be released on 6 November 2020. It features four tracks, primarily piano based.

On 22 January 2021, Birdy announced her fourth album, Young Heart, via her social media. It was released on 30 April and features 16 tracks. On the same day as the announcement, "Surrender", the first single from Young Heart was released. Her second single, "Loneliness" was released on 12 February. She cites Etta James, Joni Mitchell, Nick Drake, and Nina Simone as influences on the album's sound and wrote most of the project in Los Angeles and Nashville. Her favorite songs on the album are "Evergreen," "Little Blue," "Nobody Knows Me Like You Do," and "Young Heart."

2023–present: Portraits
On 24 February 2023 Birdy announced she would be releasing her lead single "Raincatchers" on 3 March from her upcoming album Portraits, which will be released in July of that year.

Films
Birdy's music has appeared in the films and on the soundtracks of The Hunger Games (2012), Brave (2012), The Fault in Our Stars (2014), Beyond the Lights (2014) and The Edge of Seventeen (2016).

Awards and nominations

Discography

Studio albums
 Birdy (2011)
 Fire Within (2013)
 Beautiful Lies (2016)
 Young Heart (2021)
 Portraits (2023)

Bibliography

References

External links

1996 births
Living people
!
British folk-pop singers
English people of Belgian descent
English people of Scottish descent
English women pianists
English women pop singers
English women singer-songwriters
Indie folk musicians
People from Lymington
21st-century English singers
21st-century English women singers
14th Floor Records artists
Atlantic Records artists
Warner Records artists
21st-century women pianists